Chlanidota signeyana is a species of sea snail, a marine gastropod mollusk in the family Buccinidae, the true whelks.  It was described by Harold Powell in 1951.

Description

Distribution
This marine species occurs off Timor.

References

 Lamy, Ed., 1910. Mission dans l'Antarctique dirigée par M. le Dr. Charcot (1908-1910). Collections recueillies par M. le Dr J. Liouville. Gastropodes prosobranches et scaphopodes. Bulletin du Muséum national d'Histoire naturelle 16: 318-324
 Dell, R. K. (1990). Antarctic Mollusca with special reference to the fauna of the Ross Sea. Bulletin of the Royal Society of New Zealand, Wellington 27: 1–311
 Engl, W. (2012). Shells of Antarctica. Hackenheim: Conchbooks. 402 pp

External links
 Powell A. W. B. (1951). Antarctic and Subantarctic Mollusca: Pelecypoda and Gastropoda. Discovery Reports, 26: 47-196, pl. 5-10.
 Griffiths, H.J.; Linse, K.; Crame, J.A. (2003). SOMBASE - Southern Ocean mollusc database: a tool for biogeographic analysis in diversity and evolution. Organisms Diversity and Evolution. 3: 207-213

Buccinidae
Gastropods described in 1951